Panagiotidis is a Greek surname. Notable people with the surname include:

Aristotelis Panagiotidis (born 1997), Greek footballer
Jannis Panagiotidis (born 1981), German historian
Nikos Panagiotidis (born 1979), Swedish-Greek singer

Greek-language surnames